Gold sulfide may refer to:

 Gold(I) sulfide
 Gold(III) sulfide